The Arundinoideae are a subfamily of the true grass family Poaceae with around 40 species, including giant reed and common reed. Unlike many other members of the PACMAD clade of grasses, the Arundinoideae all use C3 photosynthesis. Their sister group is the subfamily Micrairoideae.

Arundinoideae used to be quite large in older taxonomic systems, with over 700 species, but most of them have been moved to other subfamilies following phylogenetic analyses. Currently, species are placed in 16 genera and two tribes.

Tribes and genera

Arundineae
Amphipogon (syn. Diplopogon)
Arundo
Dregeochloa
Monachather

Molinieae
Subtribe Crinipinae
Crinipes
Elytrophorus
Pratochloa
Styppeiochloa

Subtribe Moliniinae
Hakonechloa
Molinia
Moliniopsis
Phragmites

incertae sedis
Leptagrostis
Piptophyllum
Zenkeria

References

 
Poaceae subfamilies